Six Pack is a 1992 Australian anthology television series, containing six hour-long dramas, first broadcast on SBS-TV. It received three nominations at the 1992 Australian Film Institute Awards including Best Mini Series or Telefeature for the episode "Piccolo Mondo".

Episodes

References 

Australian drama television series
Special Broadcasting Service original programming
Australian anthology television series